...To Be Loved: The Best of Papa Roach is the first compilation album by American rock band Papa Roach. It was released on June 29, 2010. It was the band's final album with Geffen Records, after the band left for Eleven Seven Music. The album omits one of the band's biggest singles, "Between Angels and Insects", which was a top 20 hit in the UK. The band members themselves asked their fans not to buy this CD (as well as expressed their resentment towards Geffen/Interscope) because they do not endorse this release, nor would they receive royalties for its sales.

Track listing

Best Buy DVD

Bonus videos

Making of the Video

Import DVD

Bonus videos

Making of the Video

Sales
The album debuted at number 83 on the US Billboard 200 with 5,554 copies sold in its first week of release. It was certified Silver in the United Kingdom by the BPI on July 16, 2021.

Personnel
 Jacoby Shaddix – lead vocals
 Jerry Horton – guitar, backing vocals 
 Tobin Esperance – bass, backing vocals 
 Dave Buckner – drums
 Tony Palermo – drums on tracks 10, 12, and 13

References

Papa Roach compilation albums
2010 greatest hits albums
Geffen Records compilation albums